Alex Muthengi Mwiru is a Kenyan politician. He belongs to the Party of National Unity and was elected to represent the Tharaka Constituency in the National Assembly of Kenya since the 2007 Kenyan parliamentary election.

References

Living people
Year of birth missing (living people)
Party of National Unity (Kenya) politicians
Members of the National Assembly (Kenya)